Decalobanthus is a genus of flowering plants belonging to the family Convolvulaceae.

Its native range is Tanzania, Western Indian Ocean, Tropical and Subtropical Asia to Pacific.

Species:

Decalobanthus bimbim 
Decalobanthus boisianus 
Decalobanthus borneensis 
Decalobanthus bracteatus 
Decalobanthus eberhardtii 
Decalobanthus elmeri 
Decalobanthus korthalsianus 
Decalobanthus mammosus 
Decalobanthus pacificus 
Decalobanthus peltatus 
Decalobanthus pulcher 
Decalobanthus similis 
Decalobanthus sumatranus

References

Convolvulaceae
Convolvulaceae genera